Mikhalevo is a rural locality (a village) in Novlenskoye Rural Settlement, Vologodsky District, Vologda Oblast, Russia. The population was 6 as of 2002.

Geography 
The distance to Vologda is 96 km, to Novlenskoye is 25 km. Shavrovo is the nearest rural locality.

References 

Rural localities in Vologodsky District